Larissa Keat (born 1989) is a Swiss-American actress, director and performer.

Biography 
Larissa Keat was born in Lenzburg as the elder of two daughters with an American father and a Swiss mother. She grew up mainly in Siglistorf, a small village near the German border. Since 2013 she has lived in Hamburg where she had moved for her acting education.

After graduating secondary school in 2009 at Kantonsschule Baden, she did the Arts Preparation Course at the arts school in Zurich (Zürcher Hochschule der Künste), where she started her studies in Scenography. After one year she left to study acting at Schauspiel-Studio Frese in Hamburg from 2013 to 2016.

She made her first acting experiences at „Atelier Kunterbunt“ at the age of eleven. Then she was a member of the theatre group Junges Theater Baden for eight years. After graduating drama school she has been working as a freelance actress and performer for example at Deutsches Schauspielhaus Hamburg (director: Schorsch Kamerun) or Kampnagel Hamburg (choreography: Patricia Carolin Mai). She has also worked at theaters in Switzerland quite frequently, such as Junges Schauspielhaus Zürich or DAS Theater an der Effingerstrasse in Bern.

Another part of her artistic work is her engagement in the off scene. She has written and staged several own plays (#DieKapsel, NowHere Land). With the performance Rally against Radicalisation in Marrakech and Marseille it was the first time she worked outside the German speaking part of Europe.

Theatre 

 2011: Candide (2011) by Voltaire at Theater Neumarkt, director: Florian Huber
 2012: Romulus der Grosse (2012) by Friedrich Dürrenmatt, Junges Theater Baden, director: David Imhoof
 2015: Bier für Frauen (2015) by Felicia Zeller, director: Saskia Kaufmann
 2016: Kristina und Descartes (2016) by Josh Goldberg, Salontheater Eppendorf
 2017: Katastrophenstimmung (2017) by Schorsch Kamerun at Deutsches Schauspielhaus Hamburg, director: Schorsch Kamerun
 2018: Darwins Slipslop (2018) by Josh Goldberg, Salontheater Eppendorf
 2018-2019: Nachspielzeit (2018-2019) by Jan Sobrie, Junges Schauspielhaus Zürich, director: Jan Sobrie
 2019: Ein Bild von Lydia (2019) by Lukas Hartmann, DAS Theater an der Effingerstrasse, Bern, director: Markus Keller
 2019: One Flew Over the Cuckoo's Nest (2019) by Ken Kesey, DAS Theater an der Effingerstrasse, Bern, director: Alexander Kratzer
 2020: Smith & Wesson - Rachels grosses Wagnis (2020) by Alessandro Baricco, DAS Theater an der Effingerstrasse, Bern, director: Markus Keller
 2020: Der Übergang, off scene collective Lui&Lei, Schleswig-Holstein, director: Johanna Sara Schmidt/Hatto ter Hazeborg

Filmography 
 2012: Wenn es einfach schwierig wird (2012), image film, director: Jürg Ebe
 2016: Mona (2016), bachelor film, director: Sonja Presich
 2018: Die andere Seite (2018), episode: Das Haus der Seelen, TV series, TLC, director: Florian Anders
 2018: Zahltag (2018), SAE graduation film, director: Alexander Lobinski
 2019: Amaia, 29 (2019), independent short film, director: Madhu Chard 
 2020: Mosaik Teaser (2020), Tapir Filmatelier

More artistic work

Director 

 2016: #DieKapsel, theatre performance (2016), Hamburger Sprechwerk/ Monsun Theater Hamburg

Performer 

 2015: Nearly There, dance theatre by the group Bassedanse, Mojo Club Hamburg
 2016: Catan Allay, dance piece, Kampnagel, choreography: Patricia Carolin Mai
 2017: PartitanZ, performance at Lunatic Festival Lüneburg, concept: Marit Persiel
 2018: Rally Against Radicalisation, performance in public space, Marrakech/Hamburg/Marseille, choreography: Dace Jonele[6]
 2019-2020: Dann gibt es nur eins!, by Wolfgang Borchert, open air performance as part of the Hiroschima Memorial Day and Bonhoeffer Days

Speaker 

 2012: Ohrenweide, audio walk, Theaterspektakel Zürich
 2017: live audio drama, Krimi Komplizen, Nachtasyl Hamburg
 2018: excerpts from: Du und ich und alle anderen Kinder by Bart Moeyaert, Lauschzeit, Junges Schauspielhaus Zürich

Synchronisation 

 2020: Alizée, in the Swiss series "HELVETICA", SRF

Own Projects 

 2012: Engel (2012), children’s play, text/acting
 2016: #DieKapsel (2016), theatre performance, Hamburger Sprechwerk/Monsun Theater Hamburg, concept and co-writing/production/direction
 2016: S´Goldige Nüteli (2016), children’s play, text/acting
 2018: NowHere Land! – Oder wo der Bartli den Most holt (2018), theatre research, Monsun Theater Hamburg, idea/text/production/acting/co-direction

References

External links 
 Larissa Keat  ZAV Agency
 
 Larissa Keat at filmmakers
 Larissa Keat at crew united

1989 births
Living people
Swiss film actresses
21st-century Swiss actresses
Swiss stage actresses